Bison is the twenty-fourth novel of Patrick Grainville, published in Éditions du Seuil on January 2, 2014.

History
Twenty-six years after publishing "L'Atelier du peintre" Buffalo became a new occasion for Patrick Grainville to find a central character of painting. In 1845 when George Catlin came to France to introduce his paintings and Indian objects to the king Louis Philippe I, he fascinated at the same time George Sand and Charles Baudelaire who was excited with the symphony of the red and the green in his paintings.

In 1831, George Catlin decided to break with his bourgeois environment, his comfort, to leave for going around tribes to save the memory of the Indians, the disappearance of which he apprehended. The plot takes place about thirty years before Western conquest and white invasion. George Catlin established among Sioux and became the privileged observer of their rituals, hunt for the buffalo, Sundance, war with Crows, etc. He was also seen among other Red Eagle, their leader and proud warrior, Black Impetus, his brother of weapon, in the grip of changeable and dark moods, Lame Knee, impressive pisteur, White She-wolf, a crow prisoner, woman artist, rebel and loving, Two Coloured Bird, the ambiguous shaman, and Cuisses, the amazing squaw who saved her life. George Catlin painted continuously and was obsessed with the collection of objects which he intended for «his big Indian museum», until the day when White She-wolf decided to escape.

Reception
Being "bewitching" and "splendid", Bison was considered to be one of the key novels of literary winter 2014 and received a very good reception, following the example of the big successes of the author. The style of Patrick Grainville, «master of epic poems», was received there as appeased, modest and respectful.

Bison received the Grand prix Palatine of the historical novel on April 8, 2014 and the Literary Prize of the Caen Lycéens on April 7, 2015.

Editions
 Bison, éditions du Seuil, 2014.

See also
 Native Americans in the United States 
 Classification of indigenous peoples of the Americas
 American Indian Wars
 Bison hunting

References

Bibliography
Bison de Patrick Grainville, Nelcya Delanoë, Recherches amérindiennes au Québec, volume XLIII, 2013.

2014 French novels
Novels set in the 19th century
Native American history
Novels by Patrick Grainville